Chess Records was an American record company established in 1950 in Chicago, specializing in blues and rhythm and blues. It was the successor to Aristocrat Records, founded in 1947. It expanded into soul music, gospel music, early rock and roll, and jazz and comedy recordings, released on the Chess and its subsidiary labels Checker and Argo/Cadet. The Chess catalogue is owned by Universal Music Group and managed by Geffen Records and Universal Music Enterprises.

Established and run by two Jewish immigrant brothers from what was then Poland, Leonard and Phil Chess, the company produced and released many singles and albums regarded as central to the rock music canon. The musician and critic Cub Koda described Chess as "America's greatest blues label".

Chess was based at several locations on the south side of Chicago, initially at South Cottage Grove Ave. The most famous was 2120 S. Michigan Avenue, from May 1957 to 1965, immortalized by the Rolling Stones in "2120 South Michigan Avenue", an instrumental recorded there during the group's first U.S. tour in 1964. The building is now the home of Willie Dixon's Blues Heaven Foundation. In the mid-1960s, Chess relocated to a much larger building, the former home of Revere Camera Company at 320 E. 21st Street, the label's final Chicago home. Shortly before the death of Leonard Chess in 1969, the brothers sold the company.

History

Chess brothers' company

Leonard Chess bought a stake in Aristocrat Records in 1947. In 1950, he brought his brother, Phil, into the operation, and they became the sole owners of the company. In the same year, they brought in a third partner, Evelyn Aron, and renamed the company Chess Records.

The first release from Chess was a 78 RPM single, "My Foolish Heart", backed with "Bless You", by Gene Ammons, issued as Chess 1425 in June 1950, which became the label's biggest hit of the year.

In 1951, the Chess brothers began an association with Sam Phillips, of the Memphis Recording Service, the forerunner of Sun Records. One of the most important recordings that Phillips gave to Chess was "Rocket 88", by Jackie Brenston and His Delta Cats (the band was actually Ike Turner's Kings of Rhythm), which topped Billboard magazine's R&B Records chart and was inducted into the Grammy Hall of Fame in 1998 in recognition of its influence on rock and roll. One of the most important artists that came out of Memphis was Howlin' Wolf, who stayed with the label until his death in 1976. Musical figures created for Chess by Bo Diddley, Willie Dixon, Chuck Berry, Howlin Wolf, Muddy Waters, Buddy Guy, and others were the basis of much subsequent rock and roll. Many songs created by Chess artists were later covered by many rock artists, including the Beatles, the Rolling Stones, Fleetwood Mac, the Beach Boys and Eric Clapton.

In 1952, the brothers started Checker Records as an alternative label for radio play (radio stations had a policy of only playing a limited number of records from any one imprint). In December 1955, they launched a jazz and pop label, Marterry, a name created from the first names of Leonard and Phil's sons, Marshall and Terry. This was quickly renamed Argo Records, but the name was changed again in 1965 to Cadet Records to end confusion with an existing British spoken-word label.

In 1953, Leonard Chess and Gene Goodman set up Arc Music BMI, a publishing company, which published songs by many rhythm and blues artists.

In the mid-1950s, the Chess brothers received two doo-wop groups by Alan Freed, the Coronets and the Moonglows; the former group was not very popular but the latter achieved several major crossover hits including "Sincerely", which was inducted into the Grammy Hall of Fame in 2002. Several of Chess's releases gave a writing credit to Alan Freed.

During the 1950s, Leonard and Phil Chess handled most of the recording production themselves. They brought in producer Ralph Bass in 1960 to handle the gospel output and some of the blues singers. Bassist and songwriter Willie Dixon was also heavily involved in organizing blues sessions for the label and is now credited retroactively as a producer on some re-releases. During the 1960s, the company's A&R manager and chief producer for soul and R&B recordings was Roquel "Billy" Davis, who had previously worked with Motown founder Berry Gordy on songs for Jackie Wilson, Etta James, Marv Johnson and other early Motown releases.

In 1958, Chess began producing their first LP records which included such albums as The Best of Muddy Waters, Best of Little Walter, and Bo Diddley.

Chess Records was also known for its regular band of session musicians who played on most of the company's Chicago soul recordings, including the drummer Maurice White and the bassist Louis Satterfield, both of whom later shaped the funk group Earth, Wind & Fire; the guitarists Pete Cosey, Gerald Sims and Phil Upchurch; the pianist Leonard Caston, later a producer for Motown; and the organist Sonny Thompson. In 1962, Chess Records was sued by Peacock Records for recording their artists Reverend Robert Ballinger and the Five Blind Boys of Mississippi.

In 1969, Chess Records established a subsidiary label in the U.K., Middle Earth Records, which was distributed by Pye Records. The subsidiary specialized in Psychedelic rock and was a joint venture with the Middle Earth Club in London. The Middle Earth label released only four albums and about a dozen singles before it closed in 1970.

The company was briefly run by Marshall Chess, Leonard's son, in his position as vice president between January and October 1969 and then as president following its acquisition by GRT, before he went on to found Rolling Stones Records.

Under GRT and All Platinum
In 1969, the Chess brothers sold the label to General Recorded Tape (GRT) for $6.5 million. In October 1969, Leonard Chess died and by 1972, the only part of Chess Records still operating in Chicago was the recording studio, Ter-Mar Studios. Following the sale of Chess to GRT, Phil left the label to run radio station WVON. In the 1970s, Chess Records and its publishing arm, Arc Music, were successfully sued by Muddy Waters and Willie Dixon for nonpayment of royalties due to them. Ter-Mar Studios operated at the 2120 S. Michigan building until its closure in 1979.

Some of the other artists who contributed to the legacy of Chess Records were the Flamingos, the Moonglows, Fontella Bass, Billy Stewart, the Dells and the Ramsey Lewis Trio.

Later incarnations
In the early 1980s, noticing that much of the Chess catalogue was commercially unavailable, Marshall Chess was able to convince Joe and Sylvia Robinson, who ran All Platinum, to reissue the catalogue themselves under his supervision (All Platinum had been licensing selected tracks to other companies, which ultimately resulted in the disappearance of some original master tapes). The reissued singles and LPs sold well, but by the mid-80s All Platinum had fallen into financial difficulties, and the Chess master recordings were acquired by MCA Records, which itself was later merged with Geffen Records, a Universal Music imprint.

In the 1990s, MCA Records sued Charly Records for selling CDs which contained copyrighted material by Chess artists.

In February 1997, MCA started releasing eleven compilation albums for the 50th anniversary of Chess Records.

In the 2000s, Universal's limited-edition reissue label, Hip-O Select, began releasing a series of comprehensive box sets devoted to such Chess artists as Muddy Waters, Howlin' Wolf, Little Walter, Bo Diddley and Chuck Berry.

In July 2008, the 2008 Universal Studios fire burned down a warehouse filled with Universal Music Group recording masters, including many albums and songs released by Chess. These masters, by artists such as Chuck Berry, were "priceless" and irreplaceable; while UMG claimed at the time it had copies, later reporting questioned this, with it emerging that the masters were destroyed.

Chess Records was the subject of two films produced in 2008, Cadillac Records and Who Do You Love?. In addition to the Chess brothers, both films feature portrayals of or characters based on Willie Dixon, Muddy Waters, Little Walter, Chuck Berry, Howlin' Wolf and Etta James. Cadillac Records was directed by Darnell Martin and features an ensemble cast including Adrien Brody, Mos Def, Beyoncé Knowles and Jeffrey Wright. Who Do You Love was directed by Tony Award winner Jerry Zaks and stars Alessandro Nivola playing Leonard Chess "as a complicated, driven man, hard on both his musicians and his family, yet with a real love for some of America's greatest music." The world premiere of the latter film was at the Toronto International Film Festival, September 11, 2008.

Discography

Chess LP-1425 to LPS-1553 (1956–1970)
The original Chess LP series started with LP-1425 and included albums on both the Chess and the Checker labels. After 1437, the series was used exclusively for the Chess label; the Checker label switched to a 2970 series.

Chess Vintage Series
The Chess Vintage LP series started with LP-407 and featured 9 albums released in 1970/71 with an additional three albums released in 1975.

GRT consolidated Chess/Cadet album discography (1971–1975)
In 1971 Chess Records was purchased by General Recorded Tape, a.k.a. GRT Corporation, which consolidated both the Chess and Cadet labels into a single labeling number sequence.

References

External links 
 Marshall Chess in-depth interview by Pete Lewis, 'Blues & Soul' August 2010
 The Chess Story, by Mike Callahan and David Edwards
  Chess Records at history-of-rock.com
 Chess Records in the Encyclopedia of Chicago
 Willie Dixon's Blues Heaven Foundation
 Chess Records: How Two Polish Brothers Made Music History
 Chess Records on the Internet Archive's Great 78 Project

 
American record labels
Blues record labels
History of Chicago
Jazz record labels
Chicago Landmarks
Record labels established in 1950
Record labels disestablished in 1975
Rhythm and blues record labels
Rock and roll record labels
Soul music record labels